Henri Puppo (5 February 1913 in Le Tignet, Alpes-Maritimes – 7 January 2012) was a professional road bicycle racer. He was born Italian, but changed his nationality to French in 1937. Puppo won a stage of the 1937 Tour de France.

Major results

1934
Boucles de Sospel
1936
Boucles de Sospel
Montpellier
1937
Circuit des Alpes
GP de Fréjus
Nice - Toulon - Nice
Tour de France:
Winner stage 5A

References

External links 

Official Tour de France results for Henri Puppo

1913 births
2012 deaths
Sportspeople from Alpes-Maritimes
Italian male cyclists
French male cyclists
French Tour de France stage winners
Cyclists from Provence-Alpes-Côte d'Azur